The Red Covered Bridge is a historic, wooden covered bridge located in Liverpool Township in Perry County, Pennsylvania, USA. It is a  King post bridge, constructed in 1886. It crosses Bargers Run.

It was listed on the National Register of Historic Places in 1980.

References 

Covered bridges on the National Register of Historic Places in Pennsylvania
Covered bridges in Perry County, Pennsylvania
Bridges completed in 1886
Wooden bridges in Pennsylvania
Bridges in Perry County, Pennsylvania
Tourist attractions in Perry County, Pennsylvania
National Register of Historic Places in Perry County, Pennsylvania
Road bridges on the National Register of Historic Places in Pennsylvania